Alfons Sidler (1 November 1934 – 18 February 2019) was a Swiss long-distance runner. He competed in the marathon at the 1972 Summer Olympics.

References

1934 births
2019 deaths
Athletes (track and field) at the 1972 Summer Olympics
Swiss male long-distance runners
Swiss male marathon runners
Olympic athletes of Switzerland
Place of birth missing